The Church of St Mary Magdalene is an Anglican church of the Diocese of Oxford. Named after Jesus' companion Mary Magdalene, it is located in the village of Willen, in Milton Keynes, Buckinghamshire.  Completed in 1680, it is the only surviving church among the buildings designed by the eminent scientist, inventor, and architect Robert Hooke. Regarded as a classic of early English Baroque architecture, it was designated as a Grade I listed building in 1966.

History

The Willen parish registers date back to the year 1065.  The current church stands in the place of an older one that resembled the church in Great Woolston, but without a turret, the two bells belonging to it hanging in arches, as at Little Linford.

The current church was commissioned and paid for by Richard Busby, the long-serving headmaster of Westminster School, who was also the local Lord of the Manor in the village of Willen.  The building was designed by former Westminster pupil Robert Hooke, who also supervised its construction.  In addition to his work as an architect, Hooke was the curator of experiments of the Royal Society, a member of its council, the Gresham Professor of Geometry, and Surveyor of the City of London after the Great Fire of 1666.

Work on the church was probably carried out during the period 1678–80. The project cost Dr. Busby nearly £5,000, not including the materials taken from the former edifice. George Lipscomb observes that "with good management the church might have been built for a third part of the money."

In the 19th century, the building was modified by removing the cupola from the tower and adding an apse at the end of the church's nave.  This was a reversal of Hooke's original architectural intention, which was to combine a simple nave with a decorative tower.

Architecture and fittings

It is a plain structure in the Italian style, built of brick with stone dressings, and consists of a nave with apse, a chancel, and a west tower, through which the church is entered, by some stone steps. The tower contains three bells, each inscribed: "RICHARD CHANDLER MADE ME 1683". On each angle of the tower is an ornament somewhat in the shape of a pineapple. The side walls of the nave are pierced by six plain windows; the pulpit and desk are of oak; the font, of marble, is ornamented with heads of cherubim, and has a carved oak cover; the pews are neat, and all oak; and the ceiling is coved, and enriched with angels' heads and other ornaments. The floor within the communion rails is paved with black and white marble. There is a vestry on one side of the tower, and on the other side is a room erected for a library, chiefly for divinity, and founded by Dr. Busby, for the use of the vicar. The books, to the number of 618, were removed to the vicarage, and in 1848, by order of the trustees, they were numbered and properly catalogued.

References

External links

 Panoramic Virtual Tour of Willen Church

Churches in Milton Keynes
Churches completed in 1680
Grade I listed churches in Buckinghamshire
Willen
1680 establishments in England